Amtix (stylized as AMTIX!) is a magazine that originally reviewed Amstrad computer software in the mid-1980s, published monthly by Newsfield Publications Ltd.

Unlike Zzap!64 and CRASH (its more successful sister publications from Newsfield), the original version of Amtix! was relatively short-lived. It ran for 18 issues in total between November 1985 and April 1987, plus a special preview issue (Issue zero) which was given away with Zzap!64 and CRASH.

After issue 18, Amtix! was sold to Database Publications who merged the Amtix! games sections into their own Computing With the Amstrad magazine.

Like Zzap!64 and Crash, Amtix! had very distinctive, comic-style cover art, drawn by Oliver Frey.

In September 2021 the magazine was relaunched as a quarterly A5 publication by Fusion Retro Books under the title AMTIXCPC Micro Action.

References

External links
 A list of every game that has been reviewed and/or previewed in AMTIX! 
 Amtix! covers  Scans of Amtix! front covers
Archived Amtix magazines on the Internet Archive

1985 establishments in the United Kingdom
1987 disestablishments in the United Kingdom
Amstrad magazines
Monthly magazines published in the United Kingdom
Video game magazines published in the United Kingdom
Defunct computer magazines published in the United Kingdom
Magazines established in 1985
Magazines disestablished in 1987